John Milton Chase Potter, Jr. (October 22, 1906 - January 9, 1947) was the president of Hobart and William Smith Colleges.

Biography
He was born on October 22, 1906, in Idaho Springs, Colorado on October 22, 1906, to John Milton Chase Potter Sr. and Camilla Parthenia Barber. He became president of Hobart and William Smith Colleges on September 1, 1942. He died on January 9, 1947, in Geneva, New York of a coronary occlusion.

He graduated from Harvard University.

References

People from Idaho Springs, Colorado
Presidents of Hobart and William Smith Colleges
1906 births
1947 deaths
Harvard University alumni
20th-century American academics